Kathryn Greenwood (born March 21, 1962) is a Canadian actress and comedian. She appeared on the American version of Whose Line Is It Anyway? numerous times, and played Grace Bailey on the Canadian television drama series Wind at My Back.

Life and career
Greenwood was born in Scarborough, Ontario, and from an early age wanted to be a performer. She attended high school at Agincourt Collegiate Institute, where she performed in school plays and concerts. After graduation in 1980, Greenwood spent the next two years studying acting at the American Academy of Dramatic Arts.

In 1987, she returned to Toronto, Canada, and worked in a small night club act called A Wedge of Night. She then spent five years with the Toronto branch of The Second City comedy troupe as a writer and a performer - two of her shows won Dora Mavor Moore awards in 1988 and 1992. Shortly afterwards, she and her friends Jonathan Wilson and Ed Sahely developed what she called their "Second City" spin-off, Not to Be Repeated, in which the three improvised an entire situation comedy in front of a live audience, based solely on ideas and suggestions from the audience. She also appeared with Shirley Douglas and Kiefer Sutherland in The Glass Menagerie at the Royal Alexandra Theatre in the spring of 1997. Other notable appearances in Canada include This Hour Has 22 Minutes and Royal Canadian Air Farce.

In 1996, Kathy began regular work on Canadian television on the family drama series Wind at My Back, where she spent five years, full-time, playing Grace Bailey, a junior radio M.C. in the small town of New Bedford in Ontario during the Great Depression; her portrayal of Grace Bailey was nominated for a Gemini Award for Best Performance By an Actress in a Continuing Leading Role. In 1999, Kathy was cast as Denise Stanton in the TV movie Switching Goals, starring Mary-Kate and Ashley Olsen. Later that same year, Greenwood commuted to Los Angeles to appear on such shows as The Drew Carey Show, the updated version of Hollywood Squares, and the American version of the improvisation game show Whose Line Is It Anyway?.

Greenwood is married to television writer John Dolin; they have two daughters: Phoebe and Josephine. Phoebe was born in 2000, while Josephine was born in 2001. Greenwood is part of the sketch comedy troupe Women Fully Clothed, featuring what Eugene Levy calls "the five funniest women in Canada." The group saw success in Canada and appeared in Edinburgh, Scotland.

Filmography

Film

Television

Awards/Nominations

References

External links

1962 births
Living people
Actresses from Toronto
Canadian stage actresses
Canadian television actresses
Canadian women comedians
Canadian women television personalities
Canadian voice actresses
Canadian television personalities
Canadian sketch comedians
Comedians from Toronto
People from Scarborough, Toronto
20th-century Canadian actresses
21st-century Canadian actresses
20th-century Canadian comedians
21st-century Canadian comedians
Canadian Comedy Award winners